The 1987–88 Lake Superior State Lakers men's ice hockey team represented the Lake Superior State University in college ice hockey. In its 6th year under head coach Frank Anzalone the team compiled a 33–7–6 record and reached the NCAA tournament for the second time. The Lakers defeated St. Lawrence 4–3 in overtime to win the championship game at the Olympic Center in Lake Placid, New York.

Season

Regular season consistency
The Lakers had played well ever since Frank Anzalone took over in the middle of the 1982–83 season. With the success of the program he was able to recruit players who had a good chance at playing professionally. Included in the bumper crop of freshmen were goaltender Bruce Hoffort and New Jersey Devils draft pick Jim Dowd. While the newcomers, particularly Hoffort, would make major contributions to the team it was the upper classmen who led the way.

Mark Vermette, who scored only a single goal in his freshman season, exploded out of the gate and helped Lake Superior build an early lead in the conference standings. The Lakers never found themselves on any long winning streaks but they rode Vermette's sudden scoring flurry to wins almost every weekend. The Lakers lost only a single game in each of the first three months of the season and ended 1987 with as many ties as losses (3 each).

The second half of the season was no different with the Lakers continuing to build on their lead in the CCHA, losing only one more conference game the rest of the year and finishing with a massive 10-point lead over second-place Bowling Green. The Lakers won only their second CCHA title (the first in 14 years) and were ranked so highly that it was possible for them to make the NCAA tournament bases solely on their regular season. They had achieved such heights with a combination of scoring and tough, physical play they earned them around 1,000 penalty minutes in just 38 games.

CCHA tournament
Lake Superior ran through 8th-place Ohio State winning the quarterfinal series handily. For the championship rounds the Lakers headed to Detroit to face Western Michigan, who had given them fits during the season. The semifinal saw no difference as the two teams fought to a 4–4 draw in regulation, leading to the fourth overtime game on the season between the two. This time the Lake State was able to emerge as the victor and head to the conference championship game. The final gamed followed a similar pattern to the semifinal with the Lakers and Bowling Green knotted at 2-all after 60 minutes but the Lakers could not get a second consecutive overtime goal and missed a chance to win their first ever conference tournament.

NCAA tournament
Despite the loss, Lake Superior had won 30 games by that point, a new program record, and were given the #2 western seed, allowing them to bypass the first round of the tournament and await their opponent at home. After a week off, the Lakers played host to Merrimack, a Division III team who had received the final At-Large bid into the tournament. Despite not much being expected of them, the Warriors had taken down the Hockey East champion in the first round then stunned the Lakers in game 1 of the quarterfinals 3–4. Fortunately for lake Superior, at the time the tournament format had the first two rounds being two-game total-goal series and they could get away with a poor effort in one game. Sure enough Lake Superior rebounded with 5–1 win in the second and took the series to advance to their first Frozen Four.

In the national semifinal Lake State faced its toughest challenge yet, the top-ranked Maine Black Bears. It was, however, the Lakers' tenacity that won out in the end. While Mane came in with the top offense in the country, Lake Superior was able to win the majority of puck battles and double up the vaunted easterners 6–3.

For their first championship appearance, Lake Superior faced an equally unlikely opponent in St. Lawrence who had outlasted western powerhouse Minnesota the night after. The two unheralded teams each tried to play their game and it was St. Lawrence who looked to be the better of the two early. With the Lakers getting into penalty trouble the Saints fired 20 shots on goal in the first period but Hoffort stood tall and turned everything aside. St. Lawrence was finally able to solve Hoffort in the second period, pumping three goals into the net in the middle frame.

Third-period controversy
With the game tied 3–3 late in the third period, St. Lawrence got the puck near the front of the net and had an opportunity to score when future U.S. Congressman Pete Stauber intentionally knocked the net off of its moorings. This violation would normally cause a penalty shot to be called, but referee Frank Cole only called for a face-off. The building, full of St. Lawrence partisans, booed what they felt was an obvious missed call but the Lakers were able to escape unscathed.

The game headed into overtime and wear and tear of playing back-to-back games started to show on St. Lawrence. Lake Superior attacked the Saints' cage and just before the 5-minute mark, Vermette slid a rebound through a maze of bodies into the net and gave Lake Superior its first national title.

Awards and honors
Bruce Hoffort's 49-saves in the title game helped him earn the tournament MOP and was joined by Kord Cernich and Mike DeCarle on the All-Tournament team. Mark Vermette led the NCAA in goals, setting a program record with 45 on the season and is the only Laker in history to reach the 40-goal plateau (as of 2019). His goal-scoring frenzy made him a finalist for the Hobey Baker Award but that year it would go to Minnesota's Robb Stauber, Pete's brother. Vermette had to settle for being named an AHCA first-team All-American while head coach Frank Anzalone received the Spencer Penrose Award as the national coach of the year. Hoffort's 2.65 goals against average was also the best for qualifying goalies in the nation.

Vermette was named the CCHA Player of the Year, the first Laker to win the award, while Anzalone won the CCHA Coach of the Year. Vermette and Hoffort were named to the All-CCHA First Team while Cernich and DeCarle made the Second Team.

Standings

Schedule
The team's schedule was a s follows:

|-
!colspan=12 style=";" | Regular Season

|-
!colspan=12 style=";" | 

|- align="center" bgcolor="#e0e0e0"
|colspan=12|Lake Superior State Won Series 2-0

|-
!colspan=12 style=";" | 

|- align="center" bgcolor="#e0e0e0"
|colspan=12|Lake Superior State Won Series 8-5

Roster and scoring statistics
The roster and scoring statistics were as follows:

Note: statistical archives record 1 fewer goal than Lake Superior State scored as a team.

Goaltending statistics

1988 national championship

(W2) Lake Superior State vs. (E2) St. Lawrence

Players drafted into the NHL

1988 NHL Entry Draft
The player selected in the 1988 NHL Entry Draft were as follows:

† incoming freshman

See also
1988 NCAA Division I Men's Ice Hockey Tournament
List of NCAA Division I Men's Ice Hockey Tournament champions

References

Lake Superior State Lakers men's ice hockey seasons
Lake Superior State
Lake Superior State
Lake Superior State
Lake Superior State
Lake Superior State
Lake Superior State